Eunicida is an order of polychaete worms.

Characteristics
Members of this order have an elongated, segmented body and a distinct head, normally with a separate peristomium and prostomium. Many, but not all, live in tubes which vary from a mucous sheath to a tough, horny casing. The palps vary from globular to cylindrical and there are from 0 to 7 antennae, usually smooth but occasionally jointed. There is a muscular pharynx with a dorsal pair of mandibles and a set of ventral, toothed, maxillary plates. Some species have tentacular cirri and all have unbranched parapodia. In some species, dorsal cirri, branchiae, ventral cirri and chaetae occur, but not in others.

Fossil record
The Devonian Websteroprion is the largest known fossil eunicidan annelid, with estimated length .

Families
The World Register of Marine Species (WoRMS) includes the following families in the order:

Dorvilleidae
Eunicidae
Hartmaniellidae
Ichthyotomidae
Lumbrineridae
Oenonidae
Onuphidae

References

Errantia
Annelid orders
Protostome orders